'' 897fm'' (call sign: 6TCR), formally known on-air as Twins Cities FM, is a community radio station, broadcasting in Perth, Western Australia. Their studios are located beside the Edith Cowan University in Joondalup.

History
89.7 commenced broadcasting on 16 November 2001, it was granted a permanent community broadcasting licence in 2002. As with many community based radio stations in Australia, it plays a wide range of music, and supports Australian artists, with a big focus on WA talent. 89.7 regularly broadcasts from local events in the Wanneroo/Joondalup region. The station is run by volunteers in the community and offers opportunities for locals to gain experience in radio broadcasting. The station offers free promotion for volunteer community groups for their services, events and notices.

89.7 moved its operation to ECU Joondalup in May 2008.

The station has been nominated for multiple CBAA AWARDS for programs Live and Local (3-time nominees), Lac Viet Radio, The Aurora Underground & Western.Oz.

Western.Oz won a Commendation for contributing to Local music in 2007.

89.7 was a finalist in Excellence in Music Presenting, in 2019, for Live and Local and a finalist in Excellence in Ethic & Multicultural Broadcasting for Latin Studio. Also, in 2019, the station was a winner for Excellence in Community Engagement for School of Thought.

Membership
This station, as with around 95% of Australia's community radio stations, is a member of the Community Broadcasting Association of Australia. 89.7 is also a member of Volunteering WA, Joondalup Business Association and Wanneroo Business Association.

The current chair of the 89.7FM board is Sue Myc who also presents the morning show on Wednesday

Transmission
89.7 FM Broadcasts from a nominal site in High Road, Wanneroo sharing transmission facilities with 6IX's FM signal and various telecommunication company infrastructure. Its ERP is 2 kW N and 200W south, which covers the area of Wanneroo RA1 (Cities of Wanneroo and Joondalup, or Warwick to Two Rocks).

See also
CBAA
ACMA

External links
 

Radio stations in Perth, Western Australia